The 69th Directors Guild of America Awards, honoring the outstanding directorial achievements in films, documentary and television in 2016, were presented on February 4, 2017 at the Beverly Hilton. The ceremony was hosted by Jane Lynch. The nominations for the television and documentary categories were announced on January 11, 2017, while the nominations for the film categories were announced on January 12, 2017.

Winners and nominees

Film

Television

Commercials

Lifetime Achievement in Feature Film
 Ridley Scott

Frank Capra Achievement Award
 Marie Cantin

Robert B. Aldrich Service Award
 Thomas Schlamme

Presidents Award
 Jay Roth

References

External links
 

Directors Guild of America Awards
2016 film awards
2016 television awards
Direct
Direct
2017 awards in the United States